Behind the Eyes may refer to:

Behind the Eyes (Tim Moore album)
Behind the Eyes (Amy Grant album)
"Behind the Eyes", a song by Deborah Gibson from Memory Lane, Volume 2
"Behind the Eyes" (Prison Break), a season 5 episode